Lise Nostvold (born 14 February 1987) is a road cyclist from Norway. She won the Norwegian National Road Race Championship in 2010. She participated at the 2012 UCI Road World Championships.

References

External links
 profile at Procyclingstats.com

1987 births
Norwegian female cyclists
Living people
Place of birth missing (living people)
21st-century Norwegian women